Elliott Carter (1908–2012) was an American modernist composer. Over the course of his career, Carter received two Pulitzer Prizes, and he was the first composer to receive the National Medal of Arts, "the highest award given to artists and arts patrons by the United States government." Carter was also the first American composer to receive the Ernst von Siemens Music Prize, which has been called the "Nobel Prize of Music." Carter also had the rare honor of being inducted into the American Classical Music Hall of Fame during his lifetime.

Awards for career and lifetime achievements

Awards and nominations for specific compositions

Grants and fellowships

References

Carter, Elliott